Tigullio is a traditional region and a gulf in the Metropolitan City of Genoa, Liguria, northern Italy. Part of the Riviera di Levante, it includes the communes of (from West to East) Portofino, Santa Margherita Ligure, Rapallo, Zoagli, Chiavari, Lavagna and Sestri Levante. The name derives from the ancient Ligurian tribe, Tigullii.

Italian Riviera
Ligurian Sea
Province of Genoa